ATN Urdu is a Canadian pay television channel owned by Asian Television Network (ATN).  It is a Urdu-language general entertainment network, airing programming that appeals to the entire family including comedies, serials, talk shows, music, religious programs and more.

History
In November 2000, ATN was granted approval from the Canadian Radio-television and Telecommunications Commission (CRTC) to launch a television channel called Urdu Channel, described as "a national ethnic Category 2 specialty television service targeting the Urdu-speaking community."

The channel launched on May 8, 2004 as ATN ARY Digital under a licensing agreement with ARY Digital, a television network from Pakistan.

In December 2012, the channel was re-branded ATN Urdu due to the expiration of the programming agreement with ARY. As of January 3, 2013, ATN Urdu no longer airs any programming from ARY Digital as the rights are now held by a different broadcaster.

On August 30, 2013, the CRTC approved Asian Television Network's request to convert ATN Urdu from a licensed Category B specialty service to an exempted Cat. B third language service.

References

External links
 

Digital cable television networks in Canada
Pakistani-Canadian culture
Mass media of Pakistani diaspora
Television channels and stations established in 2004
South Asian television in Canada